State Route 400 (SR 400) is a state highway in central Pershing County, Nevada. It connects the rural town of Unionville to Mill City. The route originally extended further south under its prior designation as State Route 50.

Route description

From there, SR 400 heads northward over Buena Vista Creek as it heads northward towards Coyote Ranch. The route parallels the Humboldt Range on its trek northward through the desert. The highway crosses over Star Creek and passes through the Dun Glen Flat as it heads into Mill City. State Route 400 comes to an end at the Mill City Interchange on Interstate 80 and U.S. Route 95.

History 

The route's history begins as far back as 1933, when it appeared on official Nevada maps as a county road, diverging from old U.S. Route 40 beginning in Mill City and heading southerly past the current terminus through the town of Rochester, then westerly to reconnect to US 40. By 1935, the county road had been designated State Route 50 by the state. The northern end of the route, composing the current limits of the highway, was paved by 1959.

SR 50 underwent no other major changes for several more years. However, the route would be affected by the 1976 renumbering of Nevada's state highway system that began on July 1, 1976. The paved portion of the route would become the present-day State Route 400, a designation first seen on state highway maps in 1978. The remainder of former State Route 50 was removed from the state highway system, except for a small section of the southwest end near Interstate 80 which was designated State Route 858 before also being removed from the system.

Major intersections

See also

References

400
Transportation in Pershing County, Nevada